In Greek mythology, the name Coeranus  or Koiranos (Ancient Greek: Κοίρανος "ruler, commander") may refer to:

Coeranus, an Argive son of Abas, grandson of Melampus, and father of the seer Polyeidos. Alternately was called son of Cleitus.
Coeranus, son of Polyeidos (thus grandson of the precedent), brother of Manto and Astycrateia. His own son Euchenor dedicated an image of Dionysus Dasyllius to the god at Megara.
Coeranus, a Lycian soldier, son of Iphitus, who followed their leader, Sarpedon, to fight in the Trojan War. He was slain by the Greek hero Odysseus during the siege of Troy.
Coeranus, a native of Lyctus in Crete, charioteer and squire of Meriones. He was slain by Hector.

Notes

References 

 Apollodorus, The Library with an English Translation by Sir James George Frazer, F.B.A., F.R.S. in 2 Volumes, Cambridge, MA, Harvard University Press; London, William Heinemann Ltd. 1921. ISBN 0-674-99135-4. Online version at the Perseus Digital Library. Greek text available from the same website.
Gaius Julius Hyginus, Fabulae from The Myths of Hyginus translated and edited by Mary Grant. University of Kansas Publications in Humanistic Studies. Online version at the Topos Text Project.
Homer, The Iliad with an English Translation by A.T. Murray, Ph.D. in two volumes. Cambridge, MA., Harvard University Press; London, William Heinemann, Ltd. 1924. . Online version at the Perseus Digital Library.
Homer, Homeri Opera in five volumes. Oxford, Oxford University Press. 1920. . Greek text available at the Perseus Digital Library.
 Pausanias, Description of Greece with an English Translation by W.H.S. Jones, Litt.D., and H.A. Ormerod, M.A., in 4 Volumes. Cambridge, MA, Harvard University Press; London, William Heinemann Ltd. 1918. . Online version at the Perseus Digital Library
Pausanias, Graeciae Descriptio. 3 vols. Leipzig, Teubner. 1903.  Greek text available at the Perseus Digital Library.
 Publius Ovidius Naso, Metamorphoses translated by Brookes More (1859–1942). Boston, Cornhill Publishing Co. 1922. Online version at the Perseus Digital Library.
 Publius Ovidius Naso, Metamorphoses. Hugo Magnus. Gotha (Germany). Friedr. Andr. Perthes. 1892. Latin text available at the Perseus Digital Library.

People of the Trojan War
Achaeans (Homer)
Argive characters in Greek mythology